The 2011 Horsham District Council election took place on 5 May 2011 to elect members of Horsham District Council in England. It was held on the same day as other local elections and the 2011 United Kingdom Alternative Vote referendum. The Conservatives increased their majority on the council to 12, winning a total of 34 seats.

Council composition 

Prior to the election, the composition of the council was:

After the election, the composition of the council was:

Results summary

Ward results

Billingshurst and Shipley

Bramber, Upper Beeding and Woodmancote

Broadbridge Heath

Chanctonbury

Chantry

Cowfold, Shermanbury and West Grinstead

Denne

Forest

Henfield

Holbrook East

Holbrook West

Peter Burgess stood as an Independent in Holbrook West in 2007, the year when this seat was last contested.

Horsham Park

Itchingfield, Slinfold and Warnham

Nuthurst

Pulborough and Coldwatham

Roffey North

Roffey South

Rudgwick

Rusper and Colgate

Southwater

Steyning

Trafalgar

References

2011 English local elections
May 2011 events in the United Kingdom
2011
2010s in West Sussex